Soğuksu, meaning "cold water" in English, is a Turkish word, and may refer to:

Soğuksu Creek, a stream in Mersin Province, Turkey
Soğuksu National Park, a protected area in Kızılcahamam district of Ankara Province, Turkey
Soğuksu Nature Park, a protected area in Sarıkamış district of Kars Province, Turkey
Soğuksu railway station, a railway station on the suburban railway in the European part of Istanbul, Turkey.
Soğuksu, Manyas, a village
Soğuksu, Kestel
Soğuksu, Çorum
Soğuksu, Gümüşova
Soğuksu, İspir
Soğuksu, Köprüköy

Turkish words and phrases